Thomas Joseph Murphy (October 3, 1932 – June 26, 1997) was an American prelate of the Roman Catholic Church.  He served as bishop of the Diocese of Great Falls-Billings in Montana from 1978 to 1987, as coadjutor archbishop of the Archdiocese of Seattle in Washington State from 1987 to 1991, and as archbishop of Seattle from 1991 until 1997.

Biography

Early life 
Born in Chicago, Illinois, Murphy attended Saint Mary of the Lake Seminary in Mundelein, Illinois.  He was ordained to the priesthood for the Archdiocese of Chicago at the Chapel of the Immaculate Conception at Saint Mary by Cardinal Samuel Stritch in 1958. On September 15, 1973, Cardinal John Cody appointed Murphy as rector of Saint Mary, a post he would hold until 1978.

Bishop of Great Falls-Billings 
On July 5, 1978, Murphy was appointed bishop of the Diocese of Great Falls-Billings by Pope Paul VI;  he was consecrated by Archbishop Cornelius Power on August 21, 1978. In 1979, Murphy addressed the National Catholic Education Association  on vocations to the priesthood and their on the importance for the local church.

Coadjutor Archbishop of Seattle 
On May 26, 1987, Pope Paul II appointed Murphy as coadjutor archbishop of the Archdiocese of Seattle, with immediate right of succession to Archbishop Raymond Hunthausen. Murphy's appointment came after a series of controversies surrounding Hunthausen, first prompted by an apostolic visitation to the archdiocese ordered by then Cardinal Joseph Ratzinger, prefect of the Congregation for the Doctrine of the Faith.  Ratzinger was concerned about Hunthausen violating church doctrine.  On December 3, 1985, the pope appointed Reverend Donald Wuerl as auxiliary bishop of Seattle, with authority to overrule Hunthausen in several important areas. After protests from Hunthausen and other American prelates, Pope Paul II removed Wuerl and appointed Murphy as a coadjutor archbishop with less immediate authority.

Archbishop of Seattle 
Murphy automatically became archbishop of the Archdiocese of Seattle upon Hunthausen's retirement on August 21, 1991. As archbishop, Murphy traveled extensively to parishes around the archdiocese and was an advocate for the poor and disenfranchised. He oversaw an extensive renovation of St. James Cathedral, which was completed in 1994. Under Murphy's administration the archdiocese saw an increase in registered Catholics, and an increase in outreach and ministries for women, various ethnic groups, and LGBT individuals.

In 1992, Murphy opened Elizabeth House in Seattle, which provided medical and job training for pregnant teens.  For small Washington towns that were suffering from cutbacks in the timber industry, Murphy provided $500,000 to assisting starting small businesses. To help offset the declining numbers of priests, he provided financial support to a Seattle University program to train lay people in assist in some parish duties.

Death and legacy
Murphy was diagnosed with acute myeloid leukemia in December 1996.  He was undergoing chemotherapy when he suffered a cerebral hemorrhage.  Thomas Murphy died at Providence Medical Center in Seattle on June 26, 1997. He is interred in the episcopal crypt beneath the main altar of St. James Cathedral in Seattle.

In 1999, Holy Cross High School, a Catholic school in Everett, Washington, was renamed Archbishop Thomas J. Murphy High School in his honor. In 2000, a new organ built in the apse of St. James Cathedral was named the Archbishop Thomas J. Murphy Millennium Organ. The "Archbishop Thomas J. Murphy Memorial Parish Stewardship Award" is named in his honor.

In 2006, the archdiocese dedicated the Archbishop Murphy Courtyard on the south side of the cathedral.  It contains a fountain and pool, a marker stone and a statue of Mary, mother of Jesus.

References

External links
 - official site
-interactive timeline of his life

1932 births
1997 deaths
Clergy from Chicago
Roman Catholic Archdiocese of Chicago
Roman Catholic bishops of Great Falls–Billings
Roman Catholic archbishops of Seattle
20th-century Roman Catholic archbishops in the United States
Religious leaders from Illinois
Catholics from Illinois